Imagine Cup is an annual competition sponsored and hosted by Microsoft Corp. which brings together student developers worldwide to help resolve some of the world's toughest challenges. It is considered as "Olympics of Technology" by computer science and engineering and is considered one of the top competitions and awards related to technology and software design. All Imagine Cup competitors create projects that address the Imagine Cup theme: "Imagine a world where technology helps solve the toughest problems". Started in 2003, it has steadily grown, with more than 2 million competitors representing 150 countries in 2022. The 2022 Imagine Cup World Championship was held in Seattle, United States.

History

The Imagine Cup began in 2003 with approximately 1,000 competitors from 25 countries and regions and has grown to more than 2 million competitors representing 150 countries in 2022. The Imagine Cup World Championship has been held all over the globe. Since 2014, the Imagine Cup World Championship has been held in Seattle, United States.
 2003: Barcelona, Spain – Theme: Link between people, information, systems, and devices, using Web services and. NET as the springboard.
 2004: São Paulo, Brazil – Theme: Imagine a world where smart technology makes everyday life easier.
 2005: Yokohama, Japan – Theme: Imagine a world where technology dissolves the boundaries between us.
 2006: Agra & Delhi, India – Theme: Imagine a world where technology enables us to live healthier lives.
 2007: Seoul, South Korea – Theme: Imagine a world where technology enables a better education for all.
 2008: Paris, France – Theme: Imagine a world where technology enables a sustainable environment.
 2009: Cairo, Egypt – Theme: Imagine a world where technology helps solve the world's toughest problems.
 2010: Warsaw, Poland – Theme: Imagine a world where technology helps solve the world's toughest problems.
 2011: New York City, United States – Theme: Imagine a world where technology helps solve the world's toughest problems.
 2012: Sydney, Australia – Theme: Imagine a world where technology helps solve the world's toughest problems.
 2013: St. Petersburg, Russia – Theme: All dreams are now welcome.
 2014: Seattle, United States
 2015: Seattle, United States
 2016: Seattle, United States
 2017: Seattle, United States
 2018: Seattle, United States
 2019: Seattle, United States
 2020: Digital event at Microsoft Build in Seattle, United States
 2021: Digital event at Microsoft Build in Seattle, United States
 2022: Seattle, United States
 2023: Register to take part

Competition structure

All Imagine Cup competitors create projects that address the Imagine Cup theme: “Imagine a world where technology helps solve the toughest problems.”

Competitions 
 Software DesignThe Software Design competition challenges participants to use technology to solve what they consider to be the toughest problems facing the world today. Using Microsoft tools and technology, competitors create software applications. Participants develop, test, and build their ideas into applications that can change the world.
 Game DesignThe Game Design Competition challenges participants to create a new game that illustrates the Imagine Cup theme.

Winners
There are a number of competitions and challenges within the Imagine Cup. The Software Design category is the primary competition in which its winners take home the Imagine Cup trophy.

Software Design

Office Designer

Embedded Development Competition

Interoperability Challenge

Game Design

IT Challenge

Digital Media

Health Awareness Awards

Connected Planet Award

Microsoft Azure (Cloud)

Windows Phone

Windows 7 Touch Challenge

World Citizenship Competition

Innovation Competition

Facebook Creativity Award

AppCampus Award

Skype Award

Visual Studio Online Boost

Apps For Office Challenge

Windows & Windows Phone Challenge

User Experience Challenge

Pitch Video Challenge

Project Blueprint Challenge

Innovation Accelerator
The Imagine Cup Innovation Accelerator was a program that, between 2006 and 2008, provided Imagine Cup Software Design teams with direction on the next stage of developing their innovative ideas into a business. Each year, between 2006 and 2008, six teams were selected for the Innovation Accelerator program. Participants in the Innovation Accelerator program travelled to the Microsoft Mountain View campus in Silicon Valley and received technical support and business coaching to create the must-have technology and communications applications of the future.
In 2010, Microsoft began inviting every Imagine Cup team to participate in its new program for startups: Microsoft BizSpark. With this program, startups receive access to current, full-featured software development tools and platforms.

Previous teams include:

 2006: Brazil, China, Croatia, Germany, Italy, Norway, India
 2007: Ireland, Jamaica, Korea, Mexico, Poland, Thailand,
 2008: Australia, France, Germany, Hungary, Slovakia, South Africa,

Imagine Cup Grant
A three-year, $3 million competitive grant program was established by Microsoft in 2011 to support a select number of winning teams’ solutions to go to market and realize its potential to solve a critical global problem. The inaugural grant recipients were announced at the World Economic Forum in Davos, Switzerland on January 27, 2012, which included the following teams:

 Team Lifelens from the United States
 Team Apptenders from Croatia
 Team Falcon Dev from Ecuador
 Team OaSys from Jordan

The grant packages include US$75,000 for each team, as well as software, cloud computing services, solution provider support, premium Microsoft BizSpark account benefits and access to local resources such as the Microsoft Innovation Centers. Microsoft will also connect grant recipients with its network of investors, nongovernmental organization partners and business partners.

For the 2012 version of the competition, the following teams were announced in December 2012. The teams are:

 Team Graphmasters from Germany. The team members are: Christian Brüggemann, Sebastian Heise and Iulian Nitescu.
 Team StethoCloud from Australia. The team members are: Hon Weng Chong, Andrew Lin, Mahsa Salehi and Karthik Rajah.
 Team Vivid from Egypt. The team members are: Noureldien Hussein (Nour El-Dien Hussein), Muhammed Mousa El-Orabi and Fady Fawzy Rafla.
 Team Cipher256 from Uganda The team members are: Aaron Tushabe, Joshua Okello, Dr. Davis Musinguzi, Josiah Kavuma and Joseph Kaizzi.
 Team QuadSquad from Ukraine. The team members are: Maxim Osika, Valeriy Yasakov, Anton Stepanov, Anton Posternikov and Dmytro Samoilenko.

Recognition
Imagine Cup participants from around the world who won their regional competitions in 2010 have been recognized by their government leaders.  
In October 2010, two Imagine Cup 2010 United States finalists (Wilson To   from the Mobilifeteam and Christian Hood from BeastWare) were invited to participate in the White House Science Fair.  
New Zealand's Prime Minister, Hon. John Key sent Team OneBeep from New Zealand a personal letter that congratulated them on their third-place finish.
Team Skeek from Thailand, winners of the 2010 Software Design competition, met Dr. Khunying Kalaya Sophonpanich, a member of Parliament and Secretary General of The Rajapruek Institute Foundation.
Microsoft Poland and members of the European Parliament hosted the “Pushing the Boundaries of Innovation” conference in Brussels. Imagine Cup teams from Poland (fteams and Mutants), Serbia (TFZR), Germany (Mediator), and Belgium (Nom Nom Productions) were in attendance.  
Greek Imagine Cup winners, Giorgos Karakatsiotis and Vangos Pterneas, of Megadodo, met with the Prime Minister of Greece, George Papandreou, and demonstrated their project that creates personalized descriptions of museum exhibits based on the user's needs.
Teams Xormis and Educ8 from Jamaica were honored with a special luncheon hosted by the Government of Jamaica that included an address from Hon. Bruce Golding, the prime minister. 
Team Think Green had the opportunity to meet with Ivo Josipović, President of Croatia.

See also
Imagine Cup Sri Lanka Page

References

External links

Winners
Virtual Pressroom (2017)
Blog

Microsoft events
Youth science
Science and technology awards